Jana Hughes (née Luebbe) is a member of the Nebraska Legislature for District 24 from Seward, Nebraska. She was elected to the Nebraska Legislature on November 8, 2022. Hughes was elected to the Seward School Board in 2018.

Electoral history

References

Republican Party Nebraska state senators
21st-century American politicians
Living people
1971 births
21st-century American women politicians
Texas A&M University alumni
School board members in Nebraska
People from Seward, Nebraska